Lac de Bouzey is an artificial lake in Vosges, France. At an elevation of 360 m, its surface area is 1.27 km².

Bouzey
RBouzey